Papilio osmana is a species of butterfly in the family Papilionidae. It is endemic to the Philippines.

References

osmana
Lepidoptera of the Philippines
Taxonomy articles created by Polbot
Butterflies described in 1967